Bruce Moir (born 10 November 1960) is an Australian former cricketer. He played three first-class cricket matches for Victoria in 1984.

See also
 List of Victoria first-class cricketers

References

External links
 

1960 births
Living people
Australian cricketers
Victoria cricketers
Cricketers from Melbourne